Raul A. Daza (born May 2, 1935) is a Filipino lawyer, certified public accountant, and politician, who served in the House of Representatives of the Philippines for 20 years as Representative of the 1st District of Northern Samar (1987–1998; 2010–2013 and 2016–2019). Although he could still seek another term under the term-limit provisions of the Constitution, at 86 he chose not to stand for re-election in the 2019 national elections.  He was also a three-term governor of the same province from 2001 to 2010; the Representative of the Lone District of Northern Samar from 1969 until the declaration of martial law in 1972.

Education and Professional Career 
Daza attended public elementary and secondary schools in Quezon City, Philippines.

He graduated cum laude with a Bachelor of Laws from the University of the Philippines College of Law in 1957 and was inducted as a member of Phi Kappa Phi International Honor Society (Philippine chapter) in the same year.

He later graduated cum laude from the University of the East with a degree in Business Administration in 1961.

He placed 11th in the 1957 bar examinations and is a lifetime member of the Integrated Bar of the Philippines.

Having passed the 1968 Philippine CPA examinations, he is a sustaining life member of the Philippine Institute of Certified Public Accountants (PICPA).

Hurdling the 1974 California attorneys examination, he has been a member of the State Bar of California since that year.

In 1974, he also passed the California CPA examination. He is a former member of the California Society of Certified Public Accountants.

He is the first Filipino to pass both the California attorneys and the California-certified public accountants examinations without formal education in the United States.

Before entering politics in 1967, he engaged in private law practice in the Philippines.

After joining the State Bar of California in 1974, he practiced law in Los Angeles County until 1985, when he returned to the Philippines from self-exile in the United States.

Political career

Representative (1969–1972) 
Daza entered active politics in 1967, when he ran in the special election for Representative of the then Lone District of Northern Samar to fill the unexpired term of Representative Eladio T. Balite, who had died. He lost to Vice Governor Eusebio Moore, the candidate of the administration Nacionalista (Nationalist) Party. However, in the 1969 regular national elections, as the candidate of the opposition Liberal Party he beat Moore for the same position and was elected congressman representing the Lone District of Northern Samar for one term until the declaration of Martial Law.

He held office in the 7th Congress from December 1969 to January 1973, when Congress was abolished by President Ferdinand Marcos, who assumed dictatorial powers under a new constitution after declaring martial law throughout the country on September 21, 1973.

He joined a group of legislators in a case filed in the Supreme Court to question the constitutionality of the Marcos' martial declaration and campaigned against the so-called ratification of the new constitution. After Marcos anomalously declared the effectivity of his constitution, Daza became one of the 10 congressmen of the 105-member House of Representatives, who did not sign the option under the constitution to serve in the so-called national assembly.

Exile and return (1972–1987) 
Facing imminent arrest, he fled to the United States on January 23, 1973, where later he sought and was granted political asylum by the U.S. government.  Within the year his wife and children followed him.  After the House of Representatives was abolished by President Ferdinand Marcos, Daza and his family went to the United States.

In the U.S. Daza led opposition groups from his residence in Los Angeles, California.

After Ninoy Aquino's assassination, he returned to the Philippines on August 12, 1985, although he had a pending arrest warrant. In August 1985, President Marcos stated Daza and other opponents living abroad may return to the Philippines but "must face any charges against them." Daza returned to the Philippines the following week with 14 other opposition leaders. One day after his arrival, he was put under arrest and forthwith arraigned before a Quezon City court on an indictment charging him for multiple violations of the Marcos-era anti-subversion law.

Upon arrival Daza told reporters "Our motherland is in her darkest hour... the time has come for all true Filipinos, whether here or abroad, and regardless of class, calling or roots, to rally around her." At arrival he faced charges of subversion, arson and homicide in connection with his alleged involvement with the rebel "Light-A-Fire-Movement." Former Senator Jovito Salonga, who had returned earlier that year, told reporters that Daza would play a key role in organizing the Liberal Party for the elections.

Granted bail due to pressure from a group of U.S. senators, he joined the opposition "parliament of the streets" and campaigned for Ninoy's widow Cory Aquino against Marcos in the snap election of February 7, 1986

In 1986, he was appointed by Corazon Aquino as Deputy Minister of the Presidential Commission on Good Government until 1987 when he announced his candidacy as Representative of First District of Northern Samar.

Return to the House of Representatives (1987–1992) 
After the restoration of the House of Representatives but in a new location at the Batasang Pambansa Complex, he ran for the First District of Northern Samar after restoration of House of Representatives.

Speaker Pro Tempore to Deputy Speaker (1992–1998) 
During the opening of the 9th Congress, he was eventually elected as Speaker Pro Tempore succeeding Antonio Cuenco. By 1995, he became Deputy Speaker for Visayas until 1998. He also became the President of Liberal Party in 1994 succeeding Wigberto Tanada. He held that position until 1998.

Governor of Northern Samar (1998–2010) 
After his tenure as congressman, he was appointed Commissioner of the Presidential Commission on Constitutional Reforms from 1999 to 2000. In 2001, he won as governor of Northern Samar. He was re-elected in 2004 and 2007.

Congressman again (2010–2019) 
He was elected congressman again in 2010 and regained his seat from his son Paul after he swapped places with the latter. In 2013, he lost his congressional seat to Harlin Abayon. In 2016, he regained the seat from Abayon after the latter was disqualified by the House of Representatives Electoral Tribunal. This was reversed by the Supreme Court, but speaker Feliciano Belmonte Jr. did not heed the court's decision and paved way for Daza's return. During his return as congressman, he was part of the minority at age 82 after President Rodrigo Duterte's party PDP–Laban gained a supermajority in the House of Representatives.

Personal life
Daza was born in Manila, Philippines on May 2, 1935, to Raymundo B. Daza, a lawyer, and Rosario Aguila, a public school teacher. He has eight siblings consisting of four brothers (Antonio, Raymundo Jr., Manuel and Jose) and four sisters (Tomasa, Linda, Nora and Lila).  Five (Tomasa, Linda, Antonio, Raymundo Jr. and Manuel) have died.  His remaining brother (Jose) lives in the Philippines while two (Nora and Lila) live in the United States.

He married Teresita S. Ruiz, now a retired businesswoman, on December 5, 1959, in the historic San Agustin Church in Intramuros, Manila. Their 62-year marriage is blessed with four children: Paul, a Congressman, whose wife Gigi is a beauty-and-wellness entrepreneur; Gina, who is married to Australian businessman Manjit Sadhwani; Apple, who is also married to an Australian businessman Kieran Dwyer; and John, a self-taught I.T. engineer and former Network Operations Manager (cybersecurity), who is presently studying for a formal degree, and whose wife is Nori, a Filipino-American university grants coordinator.

The Dazas have 10 grandchildren: Ryan, Rebecca, Niko, Raul, Jonathan, Mark, Therese, Kyle, Tess, and Connor.

References

1935 births
Living people
20th-century Filipino lawyers
Members of the House of Representatives of the Philippines from Northern Samar
Deputy Speakers of the House of Representatives of the Philippines
People from Northern Samar
Presidents of the Liberal Party of the Philippines
University of the East alumni
University of the Philippines College of Law alumni